North East 1 (not to be confused with North 1 East) was an English Rugby Union league which was at the 7th tier of the domestic competition and was available to teams in North East England.  Promoted teams moved up to North 2 East while relegated teams dropped to North East 2.  The division was abolished at the end of the 1999–2000 season due to RFU restructuring with teams either being moved up to North 2 East or dropping down to regional leagues such as Yorkshire 1 or Durham/Northumberland 1.

As a result of the RFU introducing the Courage League Division 5, between 1994 and 1996, some teams from North East 1 was merged with some teams from North West 1, taking the name North Division 2.  However, North East 1 remained as a league, but one rung further down the ladder. Rather confusingly during this spell North Division 2 became North Division 1 and North Division 1 became National Division 5 North.  The cancellation of Courage League Division 5 in 1996 would see the league names revert once again.

Original teams
When league rugby began in 1987 this division contained the following teams:

Blaydon
Gateshead Fell
Keighley
Morpeth
Old Brodleians (website)
Old Crossleyans
Ripon
Rotherham
Thornensians
Westoe
Wharfedale

North East 1 Honours

North East 1 (1987–1993)

The original North East 1 was a tier 7 league with promotion up to North Division 2 and relegation down to North East 2.

North East 1 (1993–1996)

The creation of National 5 North for the 1993–94 season meant that North East 1 dropped from being a tier 7 league to a tier 8 league for the years that National 5 North was active.

North East 1 (1996–2000)

The cancellation of National 5 North at the end of the 1995–96 season meant that North East 1 reverted to being a tier 7 league.  At the end of the 1999–00 season a further restructure of the leagues saw North East 1, North East 2 and North East 3 cancelled, along with their counterparts North West 1, North West 2 and North West 3.

Number of league titles

Bridlington (1)
Blaydon (1)
Darlington Mowden Park (1)
Doncaster (1)
Driffield (1)
Morpeth (1)
Halifax (1)
Stockton (1)
Rotherham (1)
Old Crossleyans (1)
Percy Park (1)
Wharfedale (1)
York (1)

See also
 English Rugby Union Leagues
 English rugby union system
 Rugby union in England

Notes

References

7